James Campbell (26 March 1886 – 25 May 1925) was a Scottish professional footballer who played for The Wednesday, Huddersfield Town and St Bernard's as a left half. His only cap for Scotland came against Wales on 3 March 1913.

Personal life 
While a The Wednesday player, Campbell shared accommodation in Sheffield with teammate Marr Paterson. Prior to the First World War, Campbell was a reservist in the British Army and he served as a driver with the Royal Field Artillery during the opening year of the conflict. In July 1915, he was invalided to a hospital in Leicester, suffering with pleurisy. Deteriorating health after the war contributed to his retirement from football and death aged 39 in May 1925.

Career statistics

References
General
 

Specific

External links

1886 births
1925 deaths
Footballers from Edinburgh
Scottish footballers
Association football wing halves
English Football League players
Sheffield Wednesday F.C. players
Huddersfield Town A.F.C. players
Scotland international footballers
St Bernard's F.C. players
Leith Athletic F.C. players
British Army personnel of World War I
Scottish Football League players

Royal Field Artillery soldiers